The yellowbelly gecko (Phyllodactylus tuberculosus) is a species of gecko. It is found in Mexico  and Central America.

References

Phyllodactylus
Reptiles described in 1834